Jiang Chen (born 24 June 1986 in Dalian, Liaoning) is a Chinese football player.

Club career 
On 6 May 2004 he made his professional debut, coming on as a substitute in the 80th minute for Sichuan Guancheng against Qingdao Hailifeng in the Chinese FA Cup. On 27 January 2006 Sichuan Guancheng was disbanded and consequently, on 5 July, Jiang moved to Tianjin Teda.

On 5 August 2009 he joined A-League side Wellington Phoenix on a season-long loan deal after trialling with the team. On 17 October 2009 he made his debut for the Phoenix as a late substitute against North Queensland Fury.
On 29 December 2009, he was released early from his loan contract with the Phoenix and returned to his parent club.

International career 
Jiang has had a strong youth career playing striker for both the China U-23 football team and the China U-17 football team. 
In May 2007, he made his debut for the China U-23 team and has since scored 6 goals in 12 appearances.

References

External links
 Wellington Phoenix profile
 

1986 births
Living people
Chinese footballers
A-League Men players
Chinese expatriate footballers
Chinese expatriate sportspeople in New Zealand
Footballers from Dalian
Expatriate association footballers in New Zealand
Sichuan Guancheng players
Tianjin Jinmen Tiger F.C. players
Wellington Phoenix FC players
Beijing Renhe F.C. players
Chinese Super League players
Association football forwards